Adélard Bellemare (March 2, 1871 – March 25, 1933) was a Canadian politician from the Mauricie area.

Background

He was born on March 2, 1871, in St-Paulin, Quebec and was a teacher.

Political career

Bellemare was elected to the House of Commons of Canada against Liberal incumbent Hormisdas Mayrand in the 1911 federal election.  He became the Independent Conservative Member for the district of Maskinongé.  He did not run for re-election in the 1917 election. He ran again as an Independent Conservative in the 1921 election, but lost.

Death

He died on March 25, 1933.

Footnotes

1871 births
1933 deaths
Adelard
Members of the House of Commons of Canada from Quebec
Independent Conservative MPs in the Canadian House of Commons